is a Japanese anime television series begun in 1995, created by Takara and Sunrise under the direction of Shinji Takamatsu, and was the sixth in the Yūsha/Brave metaseries. Goldran follows the adventures of three young boys who are tasked with finding alien robot fighters, or Braves, that are sleeping in the form of crystals. Their major antagonist is the flamboyant and thoroughly incompetent Walter, and the villains that follow him are often similarly humorous. The entire show is extremely focused on comedy and silliness almost to the exclusion of much in the way of storytelling, although the series does develop some running plot lines towards its end. In terms of television ratings, Goldran was the peak of the Brave series' popularity.

Plot
Three boys, Takuya, Kazuki, and Dai are from Ishinowa elementary school in the sixth grade. They are actively a strong, curious, mischievous trio. They obtained a mysterious jewel's "Power Stone". They bring back Dran, the golden robot, a brave who slept within a Power Stone and they became his master. However, Prince Walter Walzac, who aims at the Power Stone, has attacked them. They then go to an adventure for searching eight Power Stones that were scattered all over the world. They now aim at El Dorado's Legendra with Goldran.

Characters

Brave's Master

12 years old. The leader of the trio. His good techniques is acting like a whiny child that tricks adults. He's a very active, cheerful and very greedy shrewd boy. He likes video games and plastic models. He hates studying, causing a stroke just to have heard the word "Test". He's quick-witted about mischief.

12 years old. He's a childhood friend of Takuya. He is tall and very smart and has the knowledge of a university student. And he is the brain of the trio. He does a very cynical, severe speech and behavior. However, his zeal to the adventure is not completely inferior at all to the other two. He likes inventing, and his dream to apply an invention that a person can make. He likes idol-type girls, and he also likes pretty girls with round butts.  
 

12 years old, a childhood friend of Takuya. He has a thickish physique, and is very good at sports. He is an animal romanticist in the mild-mannered nature. However, he assists in their adventures, to the intrigue of Takuya and Kazuki. He is also obstinate. He writes an adventure diary every day. He likes cooking and flower arrangements.

20 years old. A royal prince of the Walzac and serves as the main antagonist for the first half of the series. After awakening Captain Shark he becomes a protagonist and changes his name to Captain Eta Izak (イーター・イーザック船長|Ītā īzakku senchō)

60 years old. Walter's butler and second in command. Very loyal to his master and disciplined.

12 years old. A second prince of the Walzac and very cold hearted. He is often accompanied by cyborg soldiers and his dog, .

20 years old. Prince Walter's fiance and stalker. She loves Walter very much despite him not loving her in return.

Emperor of the Walzac.

The Braves
The mecha themselves, called Braves, were created by prolific mechanical designer Kunio Okawara. While some of the Braves transform into transportation (e.g. cars and trains), others transform into animals (e.g. dinosaur and shark). Goldran itself is formed from Dran (a car) and Golgon (a kaiju). If the Braves are defeated or their masters are killed they will revert into Power Stones, indestructible gems that can only reactivate them by reciting an ancient incantation. When not in combat the Braves can regenerate from any wound they received.

(Voiced by Ken Narita): the ultimate form of Goldran. All Gold braves were united with each other. The finisher is Great Archery (Golden Arrow).
 (Voiced by Ken Narita): the second form of Goldran. He got the ability to fly, because he united with Sora-Kage. His weapon is the Missile launcher.
 (Voiced by Ken Narita): a large golden robot with which Dran unites with Golgon. He has a weak point: he cannot fly, although the jet boosters under his feet grant him levitation. His weapons are SUPER Ryugaken (super dragon fang sword) and Leg Buster and Shoulder Vulcan and Arm Shooter.
 (Voiced by Ken Narita): he is a Samurai robot. He transforms into a golden sports car. His weapon is Ryugaken(dragon fang sword) and it's a long Japanese sword. He has difficulty dealing with his naughty masters, being like their guardian. He panicked considerably because four children were born to Maria, who was the girl who had helped him and the planet where only robots live. His children's names are, the eldest son, Dorataro, the second son, Dorajiro, the third son, Dorasaburo, and his daughter, Dorayo. He forms the chest of Goldran.
: she is a Golden dinosaur robot. She is a partner of Dran, and they trust each other. She shows up from the earth. She was manipulated one time by Walter. She forms the body and head of Goldran.
 (Voiced by Naoki Makishima): a golden Ninja robot. He transforms into a golden hawk robot. The joker of the group. He seems that he is not suitable for a secret activity because his golden body is too distracting. His weapons are Hishouken and Shuriken and Sickle and chain, Shadow launcher. He forms the wings of Sky Goldran and could create a set of wings for Lean Kaiser to create Sky Leon Kaiser, though this form was never seen in the show.
: the second form of Leon Kaiser who can fly after merging with Sora-Kage to form the same winged backpack as Sky Goldran. In this form he can also use the Missile launcher. This form was never seen in the show, though the toys could combine to create this form.
 (Voiced by Ryotaro Okiayu): a robot with which Leon unites with Kaiser. His weapons are Kaiser Javelin and Kaiser Gun and Kaiser Fan. He forms the body additions of Great Goldran.
 (Voiced by Ryotaro Okiayu): he is a horned shōgun-styled robot. Transforming into an orange fighter jet. He is considerably high-handed, because he is a shōgun. However, he's a loyal, faithful person. His weapon is the Naginata Sword. He is a brave found by the last clue, first fought alone. He forms the chest of Leon Kaiser.
: he is a golden lion robot. He is Leon's partner; summoned by Leon. He forms the body and head of Leon Kaiser.

(Voiced by Naoki Bando): the ultimate form of all Silver Knights. His self-insistence is more intenser from Silverion because Fire Silver increases Silverion's powers. His finishing move is "God Finish".
 (Voiced by Naoki Bando): silver robot formed by Jet Silver, Star Silver and Drill Silver. His arms are the Tri-Shield and Tri-Lancer.
 (Voiced by Naoki Bando): the leader of the Silver Knights. He transforms from a jet plane into a red robot. He is elegant and a gentleman. His weapon is a Jet Spear and Jet Shield. His motif is a knight in Greece. He forms the torso of Silverion or God Silverion.
 : (Voiced by Naoki Bando): he transforms from a patrol car into a blue robot. He is cheerful and is snappish at times. His motif is a knight in Rome. His weapon is the Star Sword and Star Shield. He forms the arms and head of Silverion or God Silverion.
 (Voiced by Naoki Bando): he transforms from a drill tank into a green robot. He has herculean strength and is obstinate. His weapon is the Drill Axe and Drill Shield. His motif is a horned Viking in Northern Europe. He forms the legs of Silverion or God Silverion.
 Voiced by Naoki Bando): he transforms from an ambulance into a robot. He is more cheerful than Star Silver and likes joking around. His weapon is the Fire Bowgun (crossbow) and Fire Shield. He forms the body additions of God Silverion.

Other Braves
 (Voiced by Chafurin): transforms from a huge, black locomotive into a large robot. Advenger has the braves living in his hangars. He flies over the sky, run in space, and can ride the Railroad of Light that leads to Legendra. Takuya and the Braves go out to travel for the adventure, getting on-board him. Combines with Captain Shark by becoming a shoulder loaded cannon.
(Voiced by Jin Yamanoi): hidden ninth brave. Transforming into a shark, he was originally not supposed to be awakened unless the eight braves on earth were to fall into the hands of evil. Can combine with everyone through others grabbing onto him and cannon Advenger to pool their strengths together.

Walzac Machines
: appears starting in episode 1 although is not seen in humanoid robot form until episode 11. Powers include flight, storing custom gears, dual double laser cannons, a scorpion form, burrowing, a shield on the left wrist, and three laser guns in the forehead. Customized from Transformers Generation 1 Scorponok though he was never released as a toy in this line.
: appears starting in episode 1. Powers include flight, a beam machine gun, foot skis, a bazooka, and burrowing. Reappear in Brave Saga and Brave Saga 2.
: appears in episodes 13 and 14. Powers include transforming into a car and a missile on each shoulder.
: appears starting in episode 30. Powers include flight, a beam machine gun, and a flamethrower.
: appears in episode 1. Powers include flight, three cannons on each wrist, a cannon on each shoulder and knee, shoulder spike missiles, and a bomb launcher on the back.
Desetron: appears in episode 2. Powers include flight, an electric tentacle in the left wrist, and a fan in the torso strong enough to produce sandstorms.
Marinda: appears in episode 3. Powers include swimming, a machine gun and water gun hybrid called the Aqua Cutter Gun for the right arm, foot skis, and a grapple claw in the abdomen.
Sonicron: appears in episode 4. Powers include flight, wing bombs, and a laser cannon.
Turbolar: appears in episode 5. Powers include speed, a race car mode, a rifle, and levitation.
Cementos: appears in episode 6. Powers include flight, a cement mixer on each hip, and a Chinese sword.
: appears in episode 7. Powers include laser turrets around the body, tank treads, and a powerful cannon called the Great Big Cannon hidden under the bridge.
Lambda: appears in episode 8. Powers include flight, a shotgun, a chainsaw in each arm, and foot wheels.
Kermadick: appears in episode 9. Powers include swimming, retractable claw arms with the hand ends launchable on a wire, and palm lasers.
: appears in episode 10. Powers include flight, hurricane winds from the fans on its shoulders, and firing electric barriers from the forehead crescent.
: appears starting in episode 12 although it is not seen in humanoid robot form until episode 30. Customized from Transformers - Battlestars: Return of Convoy's Sky Garry. Powers include flight, storage of custom gears, a pair of powerful main cannons on each foot, a double barreled defense turret on each shoulder and below the bridge, a torso heat ray that can destroy a Himalayan mountain in one hit, launchable arms, and three laser guns in the forehead.
: appears in episodes 46 and 47. Powers include flight, teleportation, body missiles, body lasers, a torso heat beam, and regeneration.
Blizzardos: appears in episode 12. Powers include flight, a fan on each shoulder and in the torso that emit freezing winds, a bazooka, and a machine gun in each finger with explosive bullets.
Samonda: appears in episode 13. Powers include flight, a rocket launcher, and dividing itself into smaller robots.
Plasma Pulse: appears in episode 14. Powers include levitation, lightning bolts from the thunder bolts in each hand, and an electric cage platform on the back.
Kamaruta: appears in episode 15. Powers include flight, a net gun in the right hand, and three launchable scythe bladed fingers on each hand.
Inoichigo: appears in episode 15. Powers include creating realistic holograms of previous gear commanders and a bomb cannon in the "neck".
Giga Polygon: appears in episode 17. Powers include a machine gun on each shoulder and flight.
Joint Long: appears in episode 18. Powers include flight, swimming, and combining. Walter's can also release a pair of chains from within the torso armed with red electricity.
Joint Long King: appears in episode 18. Powers include flight, coiling, and red electric bolts from the eyes.
Mogelaser: appears in episode 19. Powers include burrowing in tank form, a large nose drill armed with a flamethrower, and a pair of rocket pods in the torso.
Walkion: appears in episode 20. Powers include flight, a 6-tube rocket pod in each shoulder, a rapier that emits pink electric beams, and spawning four holograms of itself. Reappears in Brave Saga and Brave Saga 2.
Hell Thomas: appears in episode 21. Powers include pincer claw arms while in train mode and a staff made of railroad ties that can emit electricity. It's named after Thomas the Tank Engine
Metal Satan: appears in episode 22. Powers include flight, a double bladed scythe, and a beam cannon in the torso.
Shell Buster: appears in episode 23. Powers include a giant drill form, spike missiles from each shield, and speed.
Striker: appears in episode 24. Powers include morphing into a flying soccer ball, a large iron ball stored in the torso, and a machine gun in the mouth.
Dan Golem: appears in episode 25. Powers include burrowing through solid rock, flight, and a ball form.
: appears in episode 27. Powers include transforming into a super sonic jet, an imitation Imperial Sword, and fusing with Golgon.
: appears in episode 27. Powers include Arm Shooters, Leg Busters, flight, and an imitation Super Imperial Sword.
Despider: appears in episode 28. Powers include flight, webs from the four spider legs from its back, and a spider-like probe in the torso
Nova: appears in episode 28. Powers include flight and a powerful heat ray in the torso.
Metia: appears in episode 29. Powers include flight, swimming, four bladed legs, emitting pink electricity from the body, and self destructing.
Ultima: appears in episodes 30 and 31. Powers include flight, beam absorbing and rechanneling, an electric grapple claw, and swimming.
: appears in episode 31. A combination from several Transformers characters such as being able to transform into a jet form from Transformers Zone's Sonic Bomber. Powers include a drill from Transformers Zone's Dai Atlas, flight, and  beam rifle. His head is based on Red Geist from The Brave of Legend Da-Garn, who in turn was based on Transformers Victory's Deszaras.
: appears starting in episode 31. Powers include light speed flight, controlling five replicas of the original Death Garrigun, an electric cage on the bow, a planet destroying energy cannon in its bow called the Planet Buster, laser turrets, and reformation.
Zorbetto: Appears in episode 34. Powers include flight and a pair of beam guns.
Veetazen: appears in episode 35. Powers include flight, ten laser guns on its top, four laser guns on its bottom, and seven laser cannons in the center of the body.
Bazaruto: appears in episode 36. Powers include flight, an energy ball cannon on the underside, a freezing foam canister, a triple laser canister, a 19-barreled machine gun canister, a cyclone launcher canister, a double barreled energy turret in its top, a laser gun in each of its five legs, and an electric net canister.
Biskvito: appears in episode 38. Powers include flight, a pair of laser guns on each wing, and four machine guns on the nose.
Embryo: appears in episodes 39 and 43. Powers include flight, teleportation, eight electric tentacles armed with laser guns in the tips, a psychic barrier that can throw objects, and can emit highly destructive heat shockwaves and beams from its face. Reappears in Brave Saga.
Duplicate Embryo: appears in episode 43. They are four duplications of Embryo armed with only flight, teleportation, and tentacles with only the laser gun armed tips. Unlike the original they can also emit energy beams from their side fins.
Draiek: appears in episode 40. Powers include flight, eight double barreled laser turrets, and forming electric cages by separating.
Genociz: appears in episode 41. Powers include flight, two large vortex emitters, and six tentacles.
: appears in episodes 46, 47, and 48.

Other Hostiles
Eskalpone: appears in episode 8. Powers include smokescreen, flight, and a double barreled turret on the back.
Usarin: appears in episodes 16, 28, and 29. Powers include flight, fourteen remote controlled beam guns called Carrot Bits stored in its basket, and a large hammer called the Picopico Hammer. Reappears in Brave Saga and Brave Saga 2.
Mirror Cat Demon: appears in episode 25. Powers include levitation, speed, green eye beams, and an elongated demon form.
Constructionbot: appear in episode 32. Powers include foot wheels, drill arms, a pair of machine guns in the body, and a pair of rockets in the torso.
Majin Mugore: appears in episode 32. Powers include levitation, mouth flames, and eye beams.
Alien Alkali: Appear in 33. They are armed with a revolver.
Alkali Fortress: appears in episode 33. Powers include flight, probes armed with a pair of laser guns, a mouth with suction and a heat beam, and energy bolts from its left eye.
Sodovenger: appears in episode 37. It is a copy of Advenger from planet Sodra. Reappears in Brave Saga 2.
Sogoldran: appears in episode 37. It is a copy of Sky Goldran from planet Sodra. Aside from Sky Godran's powers it can also extend its body parts and has a powerful cannon in its torso. Reappears in Brave Saga 2.
Sodon Kaiser: appears in episode 37. It is a copy of Leon Kaiser from planet Sodra. Reappears in Brave Saga 2.
God Sodoverion: appears in episode 37. It is a copy of God Silverion from planet Sodra. Reappears in Brave Saga 2.
Gargoyle: appears in episode 42. Its only known power is heat beams.

See also
Brave series

External links 
Official Sunrise Goldran website

1995 anime television series debuts
Brave series
Super robot anime and manga
Sunrise (company)